Church of Our Saviour or COOS is a church in Queenstown, Singapore, which began as a mission in the 1950s along Alexandra Road and has since grown into a megachurch with a weekly attendance of approximately 4,500. While it is a parish within the mainline Anglican church, COOS is known for its contemporary worship services and charismatic practices like speaking in tongues, faith healing and deliverance.

The church is known for its ex-gay ministry Choices, a group formed by Sy Rogers of Exodus International in 1991 to offer conversion therapy of a religious nature.

In 2009, a group of women associated with the church engineered a takeover of the Association of Women for Action and Research, alleging that the feminist group was harbouring and pushing a “pro-gay agenda”. They were eventually voted out at an Extraordinary General Meeting.

COOS is currently led by Senior Pastor Daniel Wee.

Vision

Church of Our Saviour defines its vision as, "Making people powerful in God. Restoring destinies. Transforming communities." Missions to foreign lands are hosted and conducted, with an emphasis on cultural sensitivity for relevancy. The beliefs of the church are defined as:

 God
 Jesus Christ
 Holy Spirit
 The Bible
 Salvation
 The Church

Choices

Choices is a ministry established by Church of Our Saviour in 1991, with the purpose of assisting people "who struggle with homosexuality recover their God-intended sexual identity. In overcoming same-sex attractions, clients are empowered to take responsibility in maintaining moral and relational wholeness." Essentially a sexual orientation conversion therapy of a religious nature, Choices uses the instrument of a safe for self-disclosure, self-discovery, change and growth, to achieve its purpose. It also emphasises on having a nurturing environment and network to support the conversion, so as to "discover life beyond the control of homosexuality."

To project a scientific basis for its beliefs on homosexuality, Church of Our Saviour, in November 2007, includes in its website a self-prepared document, which is a summation of various documents that speak against homosexuality as being a genetic trait.

The document mentions clearly its position is established firmly based on the Christian belief that God abhors homosexuality. It also states that Choices has effectively converted homosexuals, though it offers no numbers or statistics on its website. The website showcases several testimonies from individuals who previously subscribed to the homosexual lifestyle and claim to have found healing with the help of Choices ministry.

Controversies

Treatment at Choices ministry

While both Church of Our Saviour and Choices ministry offer no reliable statistics or qualitative case studies, incidences of treatment failure have surfaced across the Internet. The Singaporean-managed homosexual support website, www.yawningbread.org, features a testimony of an ex-member of Church of Our Saviour, who suffered a nervous breakdown due to the treatment.

Opposition to repealing of homosexual conduct penal code 377a
In 2007, a review of the Singaporean Penal Code suggested that code 377a, which criminalises homosexual conduct between males, be removed. Church of Our Saviour responded strongly to this, foremost by adding to its website a "position statement" stating its firm stand against homosexuality, and that homosexuality is a sin against god.

In addition, Senior Pastor Derek Hong gave various sermons on the issue. In a sermon in August 2007, titled "God's Church and Homosexuality," Hong insisted on the existence of an agenda by gay activists. This agenda allegedly seeks to ultimately silence all Ex-Gay groups, eradicate anti-homosexuality groups such as churches, strive for legalising of same-sex marriages, and strive to promote homosexuality as a viable lifestyle. Hong, however, did not offer any concrete evidence or proof of his accusations.

An email has also surfaced, allegedly claiming that Hong has circulated an email in April 2007, encouraging acquaintances to mobilise, influence public opinion, and lobby the government. The email recommends a suggested format of writing a protest and also the destination to submit the protest to, namely the Singaporean government feedback website at reach.gov.sg. While there is no evidence that Hong was indeed the author of the email, and Hong himself has issued no statement regarding it, an examination of the forum topics at reach.gov.sg reveals a large number of postings adopting exactly the recommended format.

Takeover of AWARE 
Association of Women for Action and Research is an independent advocacy organization in Singapore, noted for its work towards gender equality in the country for 25 years. Its past campaigns led to revisions to the Penal Code, e.g. giving Singaporean women the same citizenship rights as men in 2004.

In March 2009, a majority of the management committee were replaced by members of the Church of Our Saviour, after an annual general meeting which was well-attended by members who had only recently joined AWARE. The takeover was organised by Dr Thio Su Mien, former dean of Law at the National University of Singapore, who said she was concerned over AWARE's attempts to redefine marriage and family. Dr Thio Su Mien who described herself as the "feminist mentor" is also the Senior Executive Director of TSMP Law Corporation and mother of Nominated MP, Dr Thio Li Ann. Many letters to the national press questioned the nature of the reforms to be expected from the new committee members. An extraordinary general meeting was called by the members to carry out a vote of no-confidence on the new committee. Hong urged members of the church to join AWARE to support the new committee but was criticised by the Singapore's National Council of Churches for misusing his pulpit, for which Hong subsequently apologized. The new committee was ousted in May 2009 during the EGM.

Deputy Prime minister Wong Kan Seng voiced his disapproval of incident that "a group of conservative Christians, all attending the same church, which held strong views on homosexuality, had moved in and taken over AWARE because they disapproved of what AWARE had been doing", and called for tolerance, cautioning that religion and politics must be kept separate.

Notes

Churches in Singapore
Anglican church buildings in Singapore